Stavertsi Ridge (‘Staverski Hrebet’ \'sta-ver-ski 'hre-bet\) is the mostly ice-covered ridge rising to 1169 m (Mount Cabeza) on Albena Peninsula, Brabant Island in the Palmer Archipelago, Antarctica.  The feature extends 11 km in east-west direction and 4.7 km in north-south direction, and is connected to Stribog Mountains to the west by Viamata Saddle.  It surmounts Paré Glacier to the northwest, and has its north and south slopes drained by Chumerna Glacier and Grigorov Glacier respectively.

The ridge is named after the settlement of Stavertsi in Northern Bulgaria.

Location
British mapping in 1980 and 2008.

Maps
 Antarctic Digital Database (ADD). Scale 1:250000 topographic map of Antarctica. Scientific Committee on Antarctic Research (SCAR). Since 1993, regularly upgraded and updated.
British Antarctic Territory. Scale 1:200000 topographic map. DOS 610 Series, Sheet W 64 62. Directorate of Overseas Surveys, Tolworth, UK, 1980.
Brabant Island to Argentine Islands. Scale 1:250000 topographic map. British Antarctic Survey, 2008.

Notes

References
 Bulgarian Antarctic Gazetteer. Antarctic Place-names Commission. (details in Bulgarian, basic data in English)
 Stavertsi Ridge. SCAR Composite Antarctic Gazetteer

External links
 Stavertsi Ridge. Copernix satellite image

Mountains of the Palmer Archipelago
Bulgaria and the Antarctic